Dominique Robinson (born July 2, 1998) is an American football defensive end for the Chicago Bears of the National Football League (NFL). He played college football at Miami (OH).

Early life and high school
Robinson grew up in Canton, Ohio and attended and initially attended Timken High School, where he played basketball and was the starting quarterback on the football team. After his sophomore year Timken was closed and merged into Canton McKinley High School. Robinson planned to focus on basketball at McKinley, but he was persuaded to continue playing football by McKinley head football coach Dan Reardon. Robinson was rated a two-star recruit and committed to play college football at Miami University, which was the only Division I FBS program to offer him a scholarship.

College career
Robinson was moved from quarterback to wide receiver during his freshman season after determining he would receive more playing time at a different position. As a sophomore, He caught 13 passes for 156 yards and four touchdowns. Robinson averaged 21.1 yards per catch on 14 receptions for a total of 296 yards during his junior season. Going into his senior year Robinson changed positions again to defensive end after falling down the depth chart at wide receiver. He had two sacks and 2.5 tackles for loss in three games played during Miami's COVID-19-shortened 2020 season. Robinson decided to utilize the extra year of eligibility granted to college athletes who played in the 2020 season due to the coronavirus pandemic and return to Miami for a fifth season. In 2021, he had 28 tackles, 8.5 tackles for loss, and 4.5 sacks and was named third-team All-Mid-American Conference.

Professional career
Robinson was drafted by the Chicago Bears with the 174th pick in the fifth round of the 2022 NFL Draft. He made his NFL debut on September 11, 2022, in the Bears' Week 1 19-10 victory over the San Francisco 49ers, in which he recorded 1½ sacks, the most by a Bears rookie in a season debut since 1987.

Personal life
Robinson is a Christian. He is married to Emma Robinson.

Robinson's father, Anthony Robinson, played college basketball at Bowling Green.

One of his brothers, Jasper Robinson, played college football at Kent State, but a back injury ended his career short.

References

External links
 Chicago Bears bio
Miami (OH) RedHawks bio

Living people
Players of American football from Canton, Ohio
American football defensive ends
Miami RedHawks football players
Chicago Bears players
1998 births